Lucas Constantino Bethonico Foresti (born 12 May 1992) is a Brazilian racing driver who currently competes in Stock Car Brasil for KTF Sports.

Career

Karting
After a previous career in junior motocross, Foresti made his karting debut at Brasília's Kartodromo Waltinho Ferrari in June 2006, where he finished in fourth position in the Novice category. He moved into karting full-time in 2007, and immediately won four different state championships as a rookie. Competing in a Birel Sudam for Dibo Racing, Foresti won state championships in Super Centro-Oeste, Brasília, Goiânia and Minas Gerais, with second-place finishes overall in Brazil and in the Open Masters SP. Moving into the Graduate B class in 2008, Foresti again won regional championships in the same regions except Minas Gerais; also adding a second-place finish at the 500 Milhas de Granja Viana for Piquet Sports.

Formula Three
After competing in the 2008 Brazilian Grand Prix-supporting Formula BMW Americas rounds for Amir Nasr Racing, Foresti moved into the Formula Three Sudamericana in 2009, driving for Cesario Fórmula. Foresti finished third in the championship, achieving a single pole position and victory at Autódromo Internacional Orlando Moura in Campo Grande.

Foresti had been due to drive for Hitech Racing in the 2010 British Formula 3 Championship, but shortly before the season, he moved across to Carlin as part of a six-car challenge by the team.

GP3 Series
Foresti will also contest the opening rounds of the inaugural GP3 Series for Carlin.

Stock Car Brasil 
Foresti started his participation in the Brazilian Stock Car Championship in 2013, running the 2 final races. In the following year, Lucas competed in his first full season for Bassani Racing team. In 2015, Lucas Foresti moved to AMG Motorsport in order to accomplish his first win in the Curitiba GP (Oct. 18th).

Racing record

Career summary

* Season still in progress.

Complete GP3 Series results
(key) (Races in bold indicate pole position) (Races in italics indicate fastest lap)

Complete Formula Renault 3.5 Series results
(key) (Races in bold indicate pole position) (Races in italics indicate fastest lap)

 Did not finish, but was classified as he had completed more than 90% of the race distance.

Complete Stock Car Brasil results
(key) (Races in bold indicate pole position) (Races in italics indicate fastest lap)

† Did not finish, but was classified as he had completed more than 90% of the race distance.
* Season still in progress.

References

External links

 

1992 births
Living people
Sportspeople from Brasília
Brazilian racing drivers
Formula BMW USA drivers
Formula 3 Sudamericana drivers
Toyota Racing Series drivers
British Formula Three Championship drivers
Brazilian GP3 Series drivers
World Series Formula V8 3.5 drivers
Stock Car Brasil drivers
Carlin racing drivers
SMP Racing drivers
Comtec Racing drivers
DAMS drivers
Fortec Motorsport drivers
Mücke Motorsport drivers